The 2015 Missouri Valley Conference (MVC) softball tournament was held at Wilkins Stadium on the campus of Wichita State University in Wichita, Kansas, from May 7 through May 9, 2015. The tournament winner will earn the MVC's automatic bid to the 2015 NCAA Division I softball tournament. All games will be televised on ESPN3 with R.C. McBrdie and Laura Leonard calling the action.

Tournament

All times listed are Central Daylight Time.

References

Missouri Valley Conference Tournament
Tournament, 2015